Gorenje Polje may refer to the following places in Slovenia:

Gorenje Polje, Dolenjske Toplice, a village in the Municipality of Dolenjske Toplice
Gorenje Polje, Kanal, a village in the Municipality of Kanal

See also
Polje (disambiguation)